Baba Ibrahim Suma-Keita (20 April 1947 – 18 July 2020) was a Sierra Leonean long-distance runner. He competed in the marathon at the 1980 Summer Olympics and the 1988 Summer Olympics.

References

External links
 
 
 

1947 births
2020 deaths
Athletes (track and field) at the 1980 Summer Olympics
Athletes (track and field) at the 1988 Summer Olympics
Sierra Leonean male long-distance runners
Sierra Leonean male marathon runners
Olympic athletes of Sierra Leone
Athletes (track and field) at the 1978 Commonwealth Games
Commonwealth Games competitors for Sierra Leone
Place of birth missing